State Highway 36 is a state highway in the Indian state of Andhra Pradesh.

Route 

It starts at Parvathipuram and passes through Bobbili, Ramabhadrapuram, Rajam and ends at Chilakapalem.

Junctions and interchanges

See also 
 List of State Highways in Andhra Pradesh

References 

State Highways in Andhra Pradesh
Roads in Srikakulam district
Roads in Vizianagaram district